Lincoln USD 298 is a public unified school district headquartered in Lincoln, Kansas, United States.  The district includes the communities of Lincoln, Barnard, Beverly, Shady Bend, Westfall, and nearby rural areas.

Schools
The school district operates the following schools:
 Lincoln Junior-Senior High School,
 Lincoln Elementary School.

See also
 Kansas State Department of Education
 Kansas State High School Activities Association
 List of high schools in Kansas
 List of unified school districts in Kansas

References

External links
 

School districts in Kansas
Lincoln County, Kansas